Quod iam diu was an encyclical of Pope Benedict XV, given at Rome at St. Peter's on  December 1, 1918, the fifth year of his Pontificate. It requests all Catholics everywhere in the world, no matter which side they were on, to pray for a lasting peace and for those who are entrusted to make it during the peace negotiations.

The Pope notes that true, peace has not yet arrived but the Armistice  has suspended the slaughter and devastation by land, sea and air. 1 It is now the obligation of all Catholics on all sides to invoke Divine assistance for all who take part in the peace conference. The delegates who are to meet to define peace need all the support they can get for their search of a lasting peace.

 Soon the delegates of the various nations will meet in solemn congress to give the world a just and lasting peace; no human assembly has ever had before it such serious and complex determinations as they will have to take. Words, then, are not required to show how great need they have of being illuminated from on high that they may carry out their great task well. And, as their decisions will be of supreme interest to all humanity, there is no doubt that Catholics, for whom the support of order and civil progress is a duty of conscience, must invoke Divine assistance for all who take part in the peace conference. We desire that that duty be brought before all Catholics.

See also
 List of encyclicals of Pope Benedict XV

References

 Full text of the encyclical Quod iam diu of Benedict XV  the on Vatican Website .

Quotes
 

1918 in Christianity
1918 documents
20th-century Christian texts
Holy See
Latin words and phrases
Motu proprio of Pope Benedict XV
Papal encyclicals
December 1918 events